Northwest Arkansas Mall is a shopping mall located in Fayetteville, Arkansas.

History

The shopping center began as Northwest Arkansas Plaza, a single-level mall of  leasable square feet. It was developed by General Growth Properties, and among the original tenants were Sears, Dillard's, and F. W. Woolworth Company. Other tenants included Osco Drug, The Jean Joint, Beall’s, The Boston Store and Malco Theatres. Construction began in late 1977 on another anchor store, JCPenney, which opened in 1978.

A major renovation and expansion was done between the spring of 1995 and spring of 1999. Over  were added, existing stores relocated and/or enlarged and two new anchor stores constructed. The original JCPenney was replaced with a larger store, with the original structure being partially demolished. Half of its area became a Pincic Food Court of 12 fast-food restaurants. On the opposite end of the mall, a second Dillard's was built, which would house a Men's and Children's Store. The original Dillard's became a Women's Store. The final project in the renovation was an enlargement of the existing Sears. With all reconstruction work completed, the shopping hub -now known as Northwest Arkansas Mall- encompassed  leasable square feet.
 
Currently, the mall features more than 100 specialty stores, and is anchored by the aforementioned Dillard's stores and JCPenney. The mall is managed by Bayer Properties, LLC of Birmingham. Alabama.

On November 2, 2017, it was announced that Sears would be closing as part of a plan to close 63 stores nationwide. The store closed in January 2018.

Anchors
Dillard's Women's - Opened March 1972 as a full line Dillard's / Became a Women's Store in 1997
JCPenney - Original  store opened 1978 / Relocated to larger  in 1997 / Original store Partially demolished, with remaining structure made into a Food Court and additional mall stores
Dillard's Men's & Children's - Opened 1997

Former anchors

References

External links
Official website

Shopping malls in Arkansas
Shopping malls established in 1972
Buildings and structures in Fayetteville, Arkansas
Tourist attractions in Fayetteville, Arkansas
1972 establishments in Arkansas
Namdar Realty Group